Cosin is a surname, which may refer to:

John Cosin (1594–1672), English churchman
Richard Cosin (died 1596), English jurist
Edmund Cosin (or Cosyn; mid 16th century), English Catholic academic and Vice-Chancellor of Cambridge University

See also
Cosine (disambiguation)
Cosyn